This is a list of Greek football transfers for the 2018–19 summer transfer window by club. Only transfers of clubs in the Superleague Greece are included.

Superleague Greece

Note: Flags indicate national team as has been defined under FIFA eligibility rules. Players may hold more than one non-FIFA nationality.

AEK Athens

In:

Out:

AEL

In:

Out:

Apollon Smyrnis

In:

Out:

Aris

In:

Out:

Asteras Tripolis

In:

Out:

Atromitos

In:

Out:

Lamia

In:

Out:

Levadiakos

In:

Out:

OFI

In:

Out:

Olympiacos

In:

Out:

Panathinaikos

In:

Out:

Panetolikos

In:

Out:

Panionios

In:

Out:

PAOK

In:

Out:

PAS Giannina

In:

Out:

Xanthi

In:

Out:

Football League Greece

AE Karaiskakis

In:

Out:

Aiginiakos

In:

Out:

Aittitos Spata

In:

Out:

AO Chania Kissamikos

In:

Out:

Apollon Larissa

In:

Out:

Apollon Pontou

In:

Out:

Doxa Drama

In:

Out:

Ergotelis

In:

Out:

Iraklis

In:

Out:

Irodotos

In:

Out:

Kerkyra

In:

Out:

Panachaiki

In:

Out:

Platanias

In:

Out:

Sparti

In:

Out:

Trikala

In:

Out:

Volos

In:

Out:

References

Football transfers summer 2018
Trans
2018